The Lovers of Valdaro are a Swedish musical duo consisting of vocalist Erik Gabriel and producer Adam Warhester. They participated in Melodifestivalen 2019 with the song "Somebody Wants" and got the 7th place in the third semi-final.

Erik Gabriel was one of the three lookalike backing singers of the Moldovan entry in the Eurovision Song Contest 2018.

Discography

EPs
Euphoric Melancholic Electronic (2018)

Singles

Notes

References

Musical groups established in 2018
Swedish musical duos
2018 establishments in Sweden
Melodifestivalen contestants of 2019